Harpalus metarsius is a species of ground beetle in the subfamily Harpalinae. It was described by Andrewes in 1930.

References

metarsius
Beetles described in 1930